Jeffrey Evan Budoff (born 1965) is an American orthopedic surgeon. Budoff has written and published 41 articles on health topics and has authored 20 textbook chapters. In addition, he has edited five textbooks on the treatment of disorders of the upper extremity (hand, wrist, elbow and shoulder).

Teaching career

Budoff currently serves as the Clinical Associate Professor of Orthopedic Surgery at the University of Texas Health Science Center at Houston Medical School and also at the Texas Woman’s University (HealthSouth Hand Therapy Fellowship Program).

He has also served as:

 Associate Professor, Department of Orthopedic Surgery, Baylor College of Medicine, Houston, TX from 2/3/08 to 7/31/08
 Assistant Professor, Department of Orthopedic Surgery, Baylor College of Medicine, Houston, TX from 9/1/99 to 2/3/08
 Director, Orthopedic Hand & Upper Extremity Service, Houston Veterans Administration Medical Center from 9/99 to 7/05 
 Clinical Associate Professor of Orthopedic Surgery at the University of Texas Health Science Center at Houston Medical School from 11/11/09 to Present.
 Faculty, Texas Woman's University/HealthSouth Hand Therapy Fellowship Program from 1999 to 2001 and thereafter from 2008 to present.

Clinical career
Budoff has been practicing medicine for 25 years.

He is currently a Clinical Associate Professor of Orthopedic Surgery at the University of Texas, Houston, and he also practices at SouthWest Orthopedics.

References

External links
 Official Website

1965 births
Living people
American orthopedic surgeons
Harvard College alumni
Weill Cornell Medical College alumni